is a railway station on the Hokuriku Railroad Ishikawa Line in the city of Kanazawa, Ishikawa Prefecture Japan, operated by the private railway operator Hokuriku Railroad (Hokutetsu).

Lines

Station layout
The station consists of one side platform serving a single bi-directional track. The station is unattended.

Adjacent stations

History
Magae Station opened on 1 February 1943.

Surrounding area
 Kanazawa Municipal Ogidai Elementary School
 Nonoichi City Sugawara Elementary School
 Minamigaoka Hospital

See also
 List of railway stations in Japan

References

External links

 Magae Station information 

Railway stations in Ishikawa Prefecture
Railway stations in Japan opened in 1943
Hokuriku Railroad Ishikawa Line